The United Kingdom has a well-established history of independent cinema exhibition dating from the 1930s and the Film Society Movement, which still exists as the British Federation of Film Societies. Since the 1980s independent exhibition has thrived in regional film theatres set up under the auspices of the British Film Institute. The cinemas are linked to the Europa Cinemas Network, which guarantees to promote at least 50% European titles, as well as to represent the history and diversity of world cinema.

The Independent Cinema Office (ICO) has comprehensive information for developers and owners of independent cinemas.

Current locations
Principal regional film theatres include:

 Broadway Cinema, Nottingham
 Chapter Arts Centre, Cardiff 
 Cornerhouse, Manchester 
 Edinburgh Filmhouse 
 Foundation for Art and Creative Technology, Liverpool
 Glasgow Film Theatre
 National Media Museum, Bradford
 Queen's Film Theatre, Belfast
 Showroom Cinema, Sheffield
 Ultimate Picture Palace, Oxford
 Watershed Media Centre, Bristol

Directory
There is a full directory of UK independent cinemas on the ICO website.

See also
Independent movie theater

References

External links
 Independent Cinema Office (ICO)
 Europa Cinemas Network